James Stanley Petrowski (born July 12, 1982) is a former American football tight end. He was signed by the Tennessee Titans as an undrafted free agent in 2006. He played college football at Indiana State.

Petrowski has also been a member of the Frankfurt Galaxy, Indianapolis Colts, Carolina Panthers and Las Vegas Locomotives.

Professional career

Tennessee Titans
After going undrafted in the 2006 NFL Draft, Petrowski signed as a free agent with the Tennessee Titans on May 3, 2006. He was waived during final cuts on September 2. The Titans signed him to their practice squad, where he remained for the final three games.

Following the 2006 season, Petrowski was re-signed by the Titans and allocated to the NFL Europe League where he played for the Frankfurt Galaxy.

Frankfurt Galaxy
He appeared in 10 games (6 starts) for the Galaxy; he had 32 receptions for 474 yards and 5 touchdowns.  The Galaxy finished with a record of 7-3 and lost the NFL Europe League title game.

Las Vegas Locomotives
Petrowski was signed by the Las Vegas Locomotives of the United Football League on May 11, 2011.  He appeared in 7 games for the Locomotives over two seasons, he had 11 receptions for 111 yards and 1 touchdown.  The Locomotives finished the 2011 season as the UFL Runner-Up and won the 2012 UFL title.

References

External links
Just Sports Stats

1982 births
Living people
Sportspeople from Terre Haute, Indiana
American football tight ends
Indiana State Sycamores football players
Tennessee Titans players
Frankfurt Galaxy players
Indianapolis Colts players
Carolina Panthers players
Las Vegas Locomotives players